The 1920 United States presidential election in Georgia took place on November 2, 1920, as part of the wider United States presidential election. Voters chose 14 representatives, or electors, to the Electoral College, who voted for president and vice president.

Background and vote
With the exception of a handful of historically Unionist North Georgia counties – chiefly Fannin but also to a lesser extent Pickens, Gilmer and Towns – Georgia since the 1880s had been a one-party state dominated by the Democratic Party. Disfranchisement of almost all African-Americans and most poor whites had made the Republican Party virtually nonexistent outside of local governments in those few hill counties, and the national Democratic Party served as the guardian of white supremacy against a Republican Party historically associated with memories of Reconstruction. The only competitive elections were Democratic primaries, which state laws restricted to whites on the grounds of the Democratic Party being legally a private club.

Nonetheless, the largely white but secessionist “upcountry” regions of the state – lying immediately south of the few substantially unionist counties – had seen strong opposition to the policies of Democratic President Woodrow Wilson since World War I broke out. Wilson had attempted to purge anti-war Southern Democrats in the 1918 midterm elections, and with the passage of the Nineteenth Amendment and his League of Nations proposal further hostility to him emerged in the Peach State.

All these factors meant Cox lost significantly in the upcountry areas of the state where Harding carried many areas that had supported Populist Thomas E. Watson or Progressives in recent elections. Elsewhere, however, partisan loyalties remained extremely strong, so that Harding’s gain was less than most other Southern states and Georgia surpassed Louisiana – where a major anti-Wilson revolt was occurring at the polls in Acadiana – as the third-most Democratic state behind Mississippi and South Carolina.

Results

Results by county

Notes

References

Georgia
1920
1920 Georgia (U.S. state) elections